Astana City was a professional road bicycle racing team sponsored by the Samruk-Kazyna, a coalition of state-owned companies from Kazakhstan and named after its capital city Astana. The team disbanded at the end of the 2019 season.

Team history

2014: Three doping positives
During the 2014 season three riders, Ilya Davidenok, Victor Okishev and Artur Fedosseyev tested positive for anabolic androgenic steroids. Davidenok tested positive at the Tour de l'Avenir, Okishev tested positive at the Asian Cycling Championships while Fedosseyev tested positive at Tour de l'Ain. The riders were provisionally suspended awaiting doping hearings.

2015: Seven Rivers
In 2015 the team changed name to Seven Rivers Cycling Team. Six of the ten riders had previously ridden for the Continental Team Astana.

2016: Astana City
In 2016, the team changed name to Astana City and retained eight riders from Seven Rivers.

Final roster

Major wins

2012
Stage 2a Vuelta a la Independencia Nacional, Ruslan Tleubayev
Stage 4 Vuelta a la Independencia Nacional, Arman Kamyshev
Stage 2 La Tropicale Amissa Bongo, Nikita Umerbekov
Stage 5 Heydar Aliyev Anniversary Tour, Nikita Umerbekov
Overall Saguenay U23, Arman Kamyshev
Stages 1 & 3, Arman Kamyshev
Sant'Ermete, Ruslan Tleubayev
Stage 3 Baby Giro, Ruslan Tleubayev
Stage 1 Giro della Valle d'Aosta, Arman Kamyshev
Stage 5 Giro della Valle d'Aosta, Alexey Lutsenko
Stage 1 Tour Alsace, Ruslan Tleubayev
Stage 5 Tour de l'Avenir, Alexey Lutsenko
Overall Tour of Bulgaria, Maxat Ayazbayev
Stage 1b, Alexey Lutsenko
Stage 2, Arman Kamyshev
2013
Stage 7 Tour of Qinghai Lake, Evgeniy Nepomnyachshiy
Stage 5 Priirtyshe Stage Race, Ilya Davidenok
Atina, Maxat Ayazbayev
2014
Stage 7 Vuelta a la Independencia Nacional, Nurbolat Kulimbetov
Stage 5 Tour de Normandie, Marco Benfatto
Stage 2 Le Tour de Bretagne Cycliste trophée harmonie Mutuelle, Vadim Galeyev
Stages 2 & 4 Tour of Qinghai Lake, Marco Benfatto
Stage 3 Tour of China II, Vadim Galeyev
2015
Stage 4 Bałtyk–Karkonosze Tour, Nurbolat Kulimbetov
Stage 4 Tour of Bulgaria, Nikita Panassenko
2016
Grand Prix of ISD, Nurbolat Kulimbetov
2017
Stage 5a (ITT) Baltyk–Karkonosze Tour, Vadim Pronskiy
Stage 5b Baltyk–Karkonosze Tour, Grigoriy Shtein
Stage 3 Grand Prix Priessnitz spa, Dinmukhammed Ulysbayev
2018
Overall Tour of Fatih Sultan Mehmet
Stage 1, Galym Akhmetov
Overall Giro Ciclistico della Valle d'Aosta Mont Blanc, Vadim Pronskiy
Stage 4, Vadim Pronskiy

World, Continental and National champions
2012
 World U23 Road Race Championships, Alexey Lutsenko
2013
 Asian U23 Continental Time Trial Championships, Daniil Fominykh
2014
 Asian U23 Continental Time Trial Championships, Viktor Okishev
 Kazakhstan National Road Race Championships, Ilya Davidenok

See also
Astana Pro Team
Astana BePink Womens Team
List of Astana City rosters

References

Cycling teams based in Kazakhstan
Sports teams in Astana
Cycling teams established in 2012
2012 establishments in Kazakhstan
UCI Continental Teams (Europe)
Defunct cycling teams based in Kazakhstan
Cycling teams disestablished in 2019
2019 disestablishments in Kazakhstan